Fermín Uriarte (born in 1902) was a Uruguayan footballer. He was member of Uruguay squad which won gold medal at 1924 Olympics, but he did not play in any matches. He was also part of national team which won South American Championship in 1923 and 1924.

References 

1902 births
Uruguayan footballers
Uruguay international footballers
Year of death missing
Copa América-winning players
Association football defenders